Traubiinae is a subtribe of plants classified under the tribe Hippeastreae. It belongs to the subfamily Amaryllidoideae of the Amaryllis family (Amaryllidaceae).

Description 
Bulbous perennial herbaceous plants, terrestrial in habitat. Leaves linear or lorate, annual, sometimes hysteranthous.

Taxonomy 

The term was originally used by the Müller-Doblies' in 1996 as a monotypic subtribe of Hippeastreae, to include Traubia, based on Traub's original use of Traubeae for the same purpose.

Created from a redistribution of genera of Hippeastreae following a molecular phylogenetic study it is composed of the following genera, based on the presence of lorate-leaves rather than petiolate, which form the remaining genera of the tribe Hippeastreae, i.e. Hippeastrinae. In this redistribution the four species of Famatina were polyphyletic and F. maulensis segregated with Phycella and was consequently transferred: 

The generic distribution here is based on Garcia et al 2019.
 [Placea previous genus]
 Phycella (~13 species)
 Rhodolirium (2 species)
 Traubia (monotypic for T. modesta)
 Paposoa (monotypic for P. laetum)

The tribe Hippeastreae underwent a major recircumscription in 2019 and 2020. As a result a new genus, Eremolirion Nic.García (for Rhodolirium laetum and monotypic as Eremolirion laetum), leaving a more restricted Rhodolirium s. str.. In addition, Placea was absorbed into Phycella. The genus name Eremolirion was subsequently changed to Paposoa to avoid confusion with Eremiolirion.

References

Bibliography 

 
 

 
 
 
 
 
 

 

Amaryllidoideae
Plant subtribes